The 2020 A Lyga Women was the 28th season of the top-tier women's football league in Lithuania. Gintra Universitetas were the defending champions.

Gintra Universitetas won the competition for a record 19th time.

Teams 
Teams are listed in alphabetical order.

League table

References 

2020 in women's association football
2020 in Lithuanian sport
2020 in Lithuanian football
A Lyga (women)